Ignacy Gogolewski (17 June 1931 – 15 May 2022) was a Polish film actor. He appeared in more than 30 films.

Selected filmography
 Three Stories (1953)
 Tonight a City Will Die (1961)
 The Codes (1966)
 Stawka większa niż życie (1967)
 Boleslaw Smialy (1972)

Death
Gogolewski died on 15 May 2022 at the age of 90.

References

External links

Ignacy Gogolewski at culture.pl

1931 births
2022 deaths
Polish male film actors
Polish male stage actors
People from Ciechanów
Knights of the Order of Polonia Restituta
Officers of the Order of Polonia Restituta
Commanders of the Order of Polonia Restituta
Commanders with Star of the Order of Polonia Restituta
Recipients of the Gold Medal for Merit to Culture – Gloria Artis
Recipients of the State Award Badge (Poland)
20th-century Polish male actors
21st-century Polish male actors
Polish male television actors
Aleksander Zelwerowicz National Academy of Dramatic Art in Warsaw alumni